St. John's Capitals were a senior ice hockey team based in St. John's, Newfoundland and Labrador in the Newfoundland Senior Hockey League.

History

Seasons and records

Season by season results

Note: GP = Games played, W = Wins, L = Losses, T = Ties, OTL = Overtime Losses, Pts = Points, GF = Goals for, GA = Goals against, DNQ = Did not qualifyNAHA, Sr.B = Newfoundland Amateur Hockey Association senior Section B, NAHA, Sr. = Newfoundland senior "league", NSHL = Newfoundland Senior Hockey League''

Allan Cup Results

Leaders

Captains
Lloyd Cooke, 1956–57
Hugh Fardy, 1957–58
Bern Goobie, 1958–59

Coaches
Howie Meeker, 1957–59, 1966–67
Jack Vinnicombe, 1957–58
Bob Badcock, 1972–73
George Faulkner, 1975–76
Bill Riley, 1985-86 (playing-coach)

Trophies and awards

Team awards
All-Newfoundland senior hockey championships (Herder Memorial Trophy): 1970, 1973, 1974, 1975, 1976, 1978 (as Bluecaps), 1979 (as Mike's Shamrocks), 1987, 1990
First place in Newfoundland Senior Hockey League regular season (Evening Telegram Trophy): 1970, 1971, 1974, 1975, 1976, 1978 (as BlueCaps), 1987, 1988, 1989, 1996

Individual awards

S. E. Tuma Memorial Trophy (Top scorer in the regular season)
Randy Pearcey, 1978, 1981 (BlueCaps)
Andy Sullivan, 1987, 1989

T.A. (Gus) Soper Memorial Award (MVP in the regular season)

Albert "Peewee" Crane Memorial Trophy (Senior league rookie of the year)
Bruce Butler, 1970
Gary Connolly, 1973
Glen Critch, 1975
John Breen, 1979 (Shamrocks)
Mac Tucker, 1980 (BlueCaps)
Roger Kennedy, 1981
Peter White, 1987

Howie Clouter memorial Trophy (Most sportsmanlike player in the regular season)
Hubert Hutton, 1976

President's Goaltender's Award (Top goaltender in the regular season)
Edgar (Eg) Billiard, 1970, 1971
Tols Chapman, 1974, 1975
Pat Dempsey, 1976, 1978, 1979
Roger Kennedy, 1981, 1988, 1989
Peter White, 1987

Cliff Gorman Memorial Award (Most valuable player of the Herder Playoffs)
Roger Kennedy, 1983
Andy Sullivan, 1987

Honoured Members

Retired Numbers

NL Hockey Hall of Fame
The following people that were associated with the Capitals have been inducted into the Newfoundland and Labrador Hockey Hall of Fame.
George Faulkner, 1994
Hugh Fardy, 1997
Stan Breen, 1997
Bob Badcock, 2000
Merv Green, 2000
Randy Pearcey, 2002
Jim Penney, 2002
Stan Cook, 2004
Howie Meeker, 2004
Eg Billard, 2008

References

Bibliography

Defunct Ice hockey teams in Newfoundland and Labrador
Sport in St. John's, Newfoundland and Labrador
1955 establishments in Newfoundland and Labrador
Ice hockey clubs established in 1955
1990 disestablishments in Newfoundland and Labrador
Sports clubs disestablished in 1990
Senior ice hockey teams